The 2000–01 Turkish Cup was the 39th edition of the annual tournament that determined the association football Süper Lig Turkish Cup champion under the auspices of the Turkish Football Federation (TFF). Gençlerbirliği successfully contested Fenerbahçe in the final after penalty shoot-out. The results of the tournament also determined which clubs would be promoted or relegated.

First round

|}

Second round

|}

Third round 

|}

Fourth round 

|}

Bracket

Quarter-finals 

|}

Semi-finals

Summary table 

|}

Matches

Final

References

External links 
 2000–01 Turkish Cup, tff.org
 2000–01 Turkish Cup, rsssf.com
 2000–01 Turkish Cup, mackolik.com

2000–01
Cup
2000–01 domestic association football cups